The 1970 Philadelphia Phillies season was the 88th season for the franchise in Philadelphia. The Phillies finished in fifth place in the National League East with a record of 73–88, 15 games behind the Pittsburgh Pirates. The Phillies were playing their final season of home games at Connie Mack Stadium, before moving into their new facility, Veterans Stadium, at the start of the following season.

Offseason 
 October 7, 1969: Dick Allen, Jerry Johnson and Cookie Rojas were traded by the Phillies to the St. Louis Cardinals for Curt Flood, Byron Browne, Joe Hoerner, and Tim McCarver. Curt Flood refused to report to his new team. The Cardinals sent Willie Montañez to the Phillies on April 8, 1970, and Bob Browning (minors) to the Phillies on August 30 as compensation.
 November 17, 1969: Johnny Callison and a player to be named later were traded by the Phillies to the Chicago Cubs for Oscar Gamble and Dick Selma. The Phillies completed the deal by sending Larry Colton to the Cubs in January 1970.
 January 1970: Rich Barry was purchased from the Phillies by the Hawaii Islanders.
 Prior to 1970 season: Doc Edwards was released by the Phillies.

Regular season 
Against the San Francisco Giants on May 2, 1970, Phillies starting catcher Tim McCarver broke his finger on a foul tip by Willie Mays. McCarver was replaced by Mike Ryan. Two batters later, Ryan broke his finger on a slide at home plate by Willie McCovey. Ryan finished the inning but left the game. In June 1970, the series of injuries left the Phillies short a catcher and they activated Doc Edwards, who at the time was their bullpen coach. Edwards responded with two hits in his first game back and then caught a Jim Bunning–Dick Selma two-hitter.

Beginning May 22, seven more players were injured including Johnny Briggs, Don Money, Ricardo Joseph, Mike Compton, Oscar Gamble, Tony Taylor, and Del Bates. Bill Giles, Phillies’ Vice President of Business Operations, retained hexologist Jacob Zook from Lancaster, Pennsylvania to paint Pennsylvania Dutch hex signs to keep away jinxes.  Giles had Zook paint three 24-inch-diameter hex signs and had them attached to the outer roof of the Phillies’ dugout at Connie Mack Stadium.

Season standings

Record vs. opponents

Notable transactions 
 April 13, 1970: Rubén Amaro was signed as a free agent by the Phillies.
 June 4, 1970: Fred Andrews was drafted by the Phillies in the 8th round of the 1970 Major League Baseball draft.
 June 6, 1970: Doc Edwards was signed as a free agent by the Phillies.

Game log

|- style="background:#bfb"
| 1 || April 7 || Cubs || 2–0 || Chris Short (1–0) || Ferguson Jenkins (0–1) || None || 15,918 || 1–0
|- style="background:#bfb"
| 2 || April 9 || Cubs || 5–3 || Bill Wilson (1–0) || Ken Holtzman (0–1) || Joe Hoerner (1) || 5,075 || 2–0
|- style="background:#bfb"
| 3 || April 10 || Pirates || 2–0 || Woodie Fryman (1–0) || Bob Veale (0–1) || None || 3,663 || 3–0
|- style="background:#fbb"
| 4 || April 11 || Pirates || 0–4 || Luke Walker (1–0) || Grant Jackson (0–1) || Chuck Hartenstein (1) || 7,673 || 3–1
|- style="background:#fbb"
| 5 || April 12 || Pirates || 1–3  || Steve Blass (1–0) || Jim Bunning (0–1) || None || 22,395 || 3–2
|- style="background:#fbb"
| 6 || April 14 || @ Cubs || 4–5 || Ken Holtzman (1–1) || Chris Short (1–1) || None || 36,316 || 3–3
|- style="background:#fbb"
| 7 || April 15 || @ Cubs || 1–5 || Bill Hands (1–0) || Rick Wise (0–1) || None || 7,120 || 3–4
|- style="background:#fbb"
| 8 || April 16 || @ Cubs || 5–6  || Hank Aguirre (2–0) || Joe Hoerner (0–1) || None || 5,341 || 3–5
|- style="background:#fbb"
| 9 || April 17 || @ Mets || 0–6 || Tom Seaver (2–0) || Grant Jackson (0–2) || None || 5,951 || 3–6
|- style="background:#fbb"
| 10 || April 18 || @ Mets || 0–7 || Nolan Ryan (1–0) || Jim Bunning (0–2) || None || 23,500 || 3–7
|- style="background:#bfb"
| 11 || April 19  || @ Mets || 3–2  || Rick Wise (1–1) || Jerry Koosman (0–2) || None ||  || 4–7
|- style="background:#fbb"
| 12 || April 19  || @ Mets || 2–10 || Jim McAndrew (1–1) || Chris Short (1–2) || Ron Taylor (3) || 49,898 || 4–8
|- style="background:#bbb"
| – || April 21 || Giants || colspan=6 | Postponed (cold weather); 
|- style="background:#bfb"
| 13 || April 22 || Giants || 6–1 || Woodie Fryman (2–0) || Rich Robertson (0–1) || Dick Selma (1) || 6,045 || 5–8
|- style="background:#bfb"
| 14 || April 24 || @ Padres || 5–4 || Grant Jackson (1–2) || Pat Dobson (1–2) || Dick Selma (2) || 7,398 || 6–8
|- style="background:#bfb"
| 15 || April 25 || @ Padres || 1–0 || Jim Bunning (1–2) || Al Santorini (1–3) || Dick Selma (3) || 9,144 || 7–8
|- style="background:#bfb"
| 16 || April 26 || @ Padres || 3–2 || Chris Short (2–2) || Dave Roberts (1–2) || Dick Selma (4) || 14,480 || 8–8
|- style="background:#bfb"
| 17 || April 27 || @ Dodgers || 4–3 || Rick Wise (2–1) || Don Sutton (3–2) || Joe Hoerner (2) || 9,447 || 9–8
|- style="background:#bfb"
| 18 || April 28 || @ Dodgers || 3–2  || Dick Selma (1–0) || Alan Foster (2–2) || Joe Hoerner (3) || 22,772 || 10–8
|- style="background:#fbb"
| 19 || April 29 || @ Dodgers || 1–6 || Claude Osteen (2–3) || Grant Jackson (1–3) || None || 10,777 || 10–9

|- style="background:#fbb"
| 20 || May 1 || @ Giants || 1–3 || Rich Robertson (1–2) || Jim Bunning (1–3) || None || 5,328 || 10–10
|- style="background:#fbb"
| 21 || May 2 || @ Giants || 1–7 || Gaylord Perry (3–3) || Chris Short (2–3) || None || 7,422 || 10–11
|- style="background:#bfb"
| 22 || May 3  || @ Giants || 8–6  || Joe Hoerner (1–1) || Ron Bryant (2–4) || None ||  || 11–11
|- style="background:#bfb"
| 23 || May 3  || @ Giants || 13–6 || Lowell Palmer (1–0) || Frank Reberger (0–2) || None || 17,153 || 12–11
|- style="background:#fbb"
| 24 || May 5 || Padres || 8–11 || Dave Roberts (3–2) || Dick Selma (1–1) || None || 4,382 || 12–12
|- style="background:#bfb"
| 25 || May 6 || Padres || 4–3 || Dick Selma (2–1) || Clay Kirby (1–3) || Joe Hoerner (4) || 2,263 || 13–12
|- style="background:#fbb"
| 26 || May 7 || Padres || 2–8 || Pat Dobson (3–3) || Chris Short (2–4) || Ron Herbel (5) || 2,045 || 13–13
|- style="background:#fbb"
| 27 || May 8 || Dodgers || 4–8  || José Peña (1–0) || Joe Hoerner (1–2) || None || 5,170 || 13–14
|- style="background:#fbb"
| 28 || May 9 || Dodgers || 4–9  || Fred Norman (1–0) || Dick Selma (2–2) || José Peña (2) || 12,780 || 13–15
|- style="background:#fbb"
| 29 || May 10 || Dodgers || 0–7 || Don Sutton (4–4) || Grant Jackson (1–4) || None || 8,840 || 13–16
|- style="background:#fbb"
| 30 || May 11 || @ Cardinals || 0–3 || Steve Carlton (2–4) || Jim Bunning (1–4) || None || 11,310 || 13–17
|- style="background:#fbb"
| 31 || May 12 || @ Cardinals || 5–9 || Chuck Taylor (1–2) || Lowell Palmer (1–1) || None || 10,454 || 13–18
|- style="background:#fbb"
| 32 || May 13 || Expos || 6–7 || Claude Raymond (2–1) || Rick Wise (2–2) || None || 2,470 || 13–19
|- style="background:#bbb"
| – || May 14 || Expos || colspan=6 | Postponed (rain); 
|- style="background:#fbb"
| 33 || May 15 || Mets || 0–4 || Tom Seaver (7–1) || Woodie Fryman (2–1) || None || 6,373 || 13–20
|- style="background:#fbb"
| 34 || May 16 || Mets || 0–6 || Jerry Koosman (2–2) || Grant Jackson (1–5) || None || 4,826 || 13–21
|- style="background:#bbb"
| – || May 17 || Mets || colspan=6 | Postponed (rain); 
|- style="background:#fbb"
| 35 || May 18 || @ Pirates || 1–2 || Bob Moose (3–3) || Jim Bunning (1–5) || None || 5,796 || 13–22
|- style="background:#bfb"
| 36 || May 19 || @ Pirates || 2–0 || Chris Short (3–4) || Dock Ellis (2–4) || None || 6,251 || 14–22
|- style="background:#fbb"
| 37 || May 20 || @ Pirates || 2–3  || Bruce Dal Canton (2–0) || Dick Selma (2–3) || None || 5,977 || 14–23
|- style="background:#bfb"
| 38 || May 21 || Cardinals || 4–3 || Joe Hoerner (2–2) || Frank Linzy (2–2) || None || 11,769 || 15–23
|- style="background:#fbb"
| 39 || May 22 || Cardinals || 3–6 || Frank Linzy (3–2) || Mike Jackson (0–1) || None || 12,003 || 15–24
|- style="background:#fbb"
| 40 || May 23 || Cardinals || 1–3 || Bob Gibson (3–3) || Jim Bunning (1–6) || None || 12,333 || 15–25
|- style="background:#bfb"
| 41 || May 24 || Cardinals || 6–5  || Mike Jackson (1–1) || Chuck Taylor (1–3) || None || 11,939 || 16–25
|- style="background:#bfb"
| 42 || May 26 || @ Expos || 3–2 || Rick Wise (3–2) || Bill Stoneman (2–7) || Dick Selma (5) || 14,010 || 17–25
|- style="background:#bfb"
| 43 || May 27 || @ Expos || 3–0 || Woodie Fryman (3–1) || Dan McGinn (3–4) || None || 6,913 || 18–25
|- style="background:#bfb"
| 44 || May 28 || @ Expos || 5–3  || Joe Hoerner (3–2) || Bill Dillman (1–1) || Dick Selma (6) || 14,329 || 19–25
|- style="background:#fbb"
| 45 || May 29 || @ Braves || 2–5 || Pat Jarvis (5–3) || Chris Short (3–5) || None || 5,565 || 19–26
|- style="background:#bfb"
| 46 || May 30 || @ Braves || 7–5 || Jim Bunning (2–6) || Gary Neibauer (0–3) || Joe Hoerner (5) || 11,064 || 20–26
|- style="background:#fbb"
| 47 || May 31 || @ Braves || 1–9 || Jim Nash (7–1) || Rick Wise (3–3) || None || 18,482 || 20–27

|- style="background:#fbb"
| 48 || June 2 || @ Reds || 2–7  || Wayne Simpson (7–1) || Woodie Fryman (3–2) || None || 10,542 || 20–28
|- style="background:#bfb"
| 49 || June 3 || @ Reds || 11–4 || Jim Bunning (3–6) || Pedro Borbón (0–2) || Dick Selma (7) || 5,887 || 21–28
|- style="background:#fbb"
| 50 || June 5 || @ Astros || 7–8  || Jim Ray (3–2) || Dick Selma (2–4) || None || 12,292 || 21–29
|- style="background:#bfb"
| 51 || June 6 || @ Astros || 7–3 || Rick Wise (4–3) || Don Wilson (1–2) || Joe Hoerner (6) || 18,644 || 22–29
|- style="background:#bfb"
| 52 || June 7 || @ Astros || 10–3 || Woodie Fryman (4–2) || Larry Dierker (8–6) || None || 16,353 || 23–29
|- style="background:#bfb"
| 53 || June 9 || Braves || 2–1 || Jim Bunning (4–6) || Pat Jarvis (6–4) || Dick Selma (8) || 15,810 || 24–29
|- style="background:#fbb"
| 54 || June 10 || Braves || 1–5 || George Stone (6–1) || Chris Short (3–6) || None || 9,213 || 24–30
|- style="background:#fbb"
| 55 || June 11 || Braves || 4–6 || Jim Nash (8–2) || Rick Wise (4–4) || Bob Priddy (4) || 7,862 || 24–31
|- style="background:#fbb"
| 56 || June 12 || Reds || 1–3 || Wayne Simpson (9–1) || Woodie Fryman (4–3) || None || 10,553 || 24–32
|- style="background:#bfb"
| 57 || June 13 || Reds || 6–3 || Jim Bunning (5–6) || Gary Nolan (7–3) || None || 18,568 || 25–32
|- style="background:#fbb"
| 58 || June 14 || Reds || 1–10 || Jim McGlothlin (9–3) || Chris Short (3–7) || None || 16,658 || 25–33
|- style="background:#bbb"
| – || June 15 || Astros || colspan=6 | Postponed (rain); 
|- style="background:#bfb"
| 59 || June 16 || Astros || 2–1  || Joe Hoerner (4–2) || Jim Bouton (2–4) || None || 3,708 || 26–33
|- style="background:#bfb"
| 60 || June 17 || Astros || 4–2 || Woodie Fryman (5–3) || Larry Dierker (8–7) || Barry Lersch (1) || 6,767 || 27–33
|- style="background:#fbb"
| 61 || June 19 || @ Mets || 3–13 || Tom Seaver (10–5) || Jim Bunning (5–7) || None || 43,866 || 27–34
|- style="background:#bfb"
| 62 || June 20 || @ Mets || 2–1 || Chris Short (4–7) || Jerry Koosman (2–4) || None || 41,897 || 28–34
|- style="background:#bbb"
| – || June 21 || @ Mets || colspan=6 | Postponed (rain); 
|- style="background:#bfb"
| 63 || June 22  || Expos || 6–0 || Woodie Fryman (6–3) || Bill Stoneman (4–9) || None ||  || 29–34
|- style="background:#bfb"
| 64 || June 22  || Expos || 3–2 || Rick Wise (5–4) || Steve Renko (2–4) || None || 20,535 || 30–34
|- style="background:#fbb"
| 65 || June 23 || Expos || 1–2 || Dan McGinn (4–5) || Jim Bunning (5–8) || Claude Raymond (11) || 8,221 || 30–35
|- style="background:#fbb"
| 66 || June 24 || Expos || 0–8 || Carl Morton (7–5) || Chris Short (4–8) || None || 6,869 || 30–36
|- style="background:#bfb"
| 67 || June 25 || Expos || 3–2  || Joe Hoerner (5–2) || Claude Raymond (3–5) || None || 5,065 || 31–36
|- style="background:#fbb"
| 68 || June 26 || @ Cardinals || 0–7 || Bob Gibson (10–3) || Rick Wise (5–5) || None || 40,221 || 31–37
|- style="background:#fbb"
| 69 || June 27 || @ Cardinals || 8–9 || Ted Abernathy (1–0) || Joe Hoerner (5–3) || Sal Campisi (2) || 20,549 || 31–38
|- style="background:#fbb"
| 70 || June 28  || @ Cardinals || 4–5 || Mike Torrez (6–7) || Dick Selma (2–5) || None ||  || 31–39
|- style="background:#bfb"
| 71 || June 28  || @ Cardinals || 8–3  || Dick Selma (3–5) || Billy McCool (0–3) || None || 38,194 || 32–39
|- style="background:#bbb"
| – || June 29 || @ Expos || colspan=6 | Postponed (rain); 
|- style="background:#fbb"
| 72 || June 30 || @ Expos || 1–8 || Steve Renko (4–4) || Rick Wise (5–6) || None || 20,038 || 32–40

|- style="background:#fbb"
| 73 || July 1  || @ Expos || 1–11 || Rich Nye (2–0) || Woodie Fryman (6–4) || None ||  || 32–41
|- style="background:#fbb"
| 74 || July 1  || @ Expos || 1–4 || Dan McGinn (5–6) || Grant Jackson (1–6) || Howie Reed (2) || 25,623 || 32–42
|- style="background:#bfb"
| 75 || July 2  || Mets || 6–1 || Jim Bunning (6–8) || Gary Gentry (7–5) || Dick Selma (9) ||  || 33–42
|- style="background:#bfb"
| 76 || July 2  || Mets || 3–2 || Chris Short (5–8) || Don Cardwell (0–2) || Dick Selma (10) || 24,474 || 34–42
|- style="background:#fbb"
| 77 || July 3 || Mets || 3–4 || Ray Sadecki (6–2) || Rick Wise (5–7) || Rich Folkers (1) || 10,508 || 34–43
|- style="background:#fbb"
| 78 || July 4 || Mets || 2–7 || Tom Seaver (13–5) || Grant Jackson (1–7) || None || 7,866 || 34–44
|- style="background:#fbb"
| 79 || July 5 || Mets || 4–5 || Jerry Koosman (5–4) || Woodie Fryman (6–5) || Danny Frisella (1) || 12,609 || 34–45
|- style="background:#fbb"
| 80 || July 6 || Pirates || 5–7 || Jim Nelson (4–0) || Jim Bunning (6–9) || Dave Giusti (13) || 6,145 || 34–46
|- style="background:#fbb"
| 81 || July 7 || Pirates || 2–4 || Bob Veale (6–10) || Chris Short (5–9) || Dave Giusti (14) || 6,938 || 34–47
|- style="background:#bfb"
| 82 || July 8 || Pirates || 2–0 || Rick Wise (6–7) || Steve Blass (6–10) || None || 7,038 || 35–47
|- style="background:#fbb"
| 83 || July 10 || @ Cubs || 0–2 || Ferguson Jenkins (10–10) || Grant Jackson (1–8) || None || 22,399 || 35–48
|- style="background:#bfb"
| 84 || July 11 || @ Cubs || 10–4 || Joe Hoerner (6–3) || Roberto Rodríguez (1–1) || Barry Lersch (2) || 25,972 || 36–48
|- style="background:#fbb"
| 85 || July 12 || @ Cubs || 2–10 || Ken Holtzman (9–7) || Chris Short (5–10) || None || 28,270 || 36–49
|- style="background:#bbcaff;"
| – || July 14 ||colspan=7 |1970 Major League Baseball All-Star Game at Riverfront Stadium in Cincinnati
|- style="background:#bfb"
| 86 || July 16 || @ Padres || 10–7 || Dick Selma (4–5) || Ron Willis (1–1) || Joe Hoerner (7) || 6,938 || 37–49
|- style="background:#bfb"
| 87 || July 17 || @ Padres || 8–3 || Rick Wise (7–7) || Clay Kirby (5–11) || None || 5,758 || 38–49
|- style="background:#bfb"
| 88 || July 18 || @ Padres || 7–4 || Jim Bunning (7–9) || Earl Wilson (4–7) || Dick Selma (11) || 4,317 || 39–49
|- style="background:#bfb"
| 89 || July 19  || @ Dodgers || 9–4 || Fred Wenz (1–0) || Jim Brewer (4–4) || Dick Selma (12) ||  || 40–49
|- style="background:#bfb"
| 90 || July 19  || @ Dodgers || 4–2 || Barry Lersch (1–0) || Pete Mikkelsen (0–1) || None || 28,396 || 41–49
|- style="background:#fbb"
| 91 || July 20 || @ Dodgers || 0–5 || Bill Singer (7–3) || Woodie Fryman (6–6) || None || 12,454 || 41–50
|- style="background:#bfb"
| 92 || July 21 || @ Giants || 9–6 || Rick Wise (8–7) || Juan Marichal (3–9) || Joe Hoerner (8) || 3,418 || 42–50
|- style="background:#bfb"
| 93 || July 22 || @ Giants || 5–2 || Jim Bunning (8–9) || Gaylord Perry (14–9) || Dick Selma (13) || 4,567 || 43–50
|- style="background:#bfb"
| 94 || July 24 || Padres || 4–3 || Grant Jackson (2–8) || Ron Herbel (6–3) || None || 5,078 || 44–50
|- style="background:#bfb"
| 95 || July 25 || Padres || 9–2 || Barry Lersch (2–0) || Dave Roberts (5–8) || None || 20,292 || 45–50
|- style="background:#fbb"
| 96 || July 26 || Padres || 2–16 || Pat Dobson (7–10) || Rick Wise (8–8) || None || 5,208 || 45–51
|- style="background:#bfb"
| 97 || July 27 || Dodgers || 10–3 || Woodie Fryman (7–6) || Claude Osteen (11–8) || Dick Selma (14) || 6,017 || 46–51
|- style="background:#fbb"
| 98 || July 28 || Dodgers || 2–6 || Joe Moeller (5–4) || Jim Bunning (8–10) || Jim Brewer (14) || 14,000 || 46–52
|- style="background:#bbb"
| – || July 29 || Dodgers || colspan=6 | Cancelled (rain); 
|- style="background:#fbb"
| 99 || July 31  || Giants || 3–8 || Juan Marichal (5–9) || Grant Jackson (2–9) || None ||  || 46–53
|- style="background:#fbb"
| 100 || July 31  || Giants || 2–7 || Frank Reberger (3–4) || Chris Short (5–11) || Don McMahon (11) || 15,716 || 46–54

|- style="background:#bfb"
| 101 || August 1  || Giants || 6–5  || Dick Selma (5–5) || Jerry Johnson (3–2) || None ||  || 47–54
|- style="background:#bfb"
| 102 || August 1  || Giants || 6–1 || Rick Wise (9–8) || Don Carrithers (0–1) || Barry Lersch (3) || 18,010 || 48–54
|- style="background:#bfb"
| 103 || August 2 || Giants || 7–6 || Fred Wenz (2–0) || Mike Davison (2–4) || None || 10,201 || 49–54
|- style="background:#fbb"
| 104 || August 3 || Cardinals || 1–4 || Mike Torrez (8–9) || Grant Jackson (2–10) || None || 12,163 || 49–55
|- style="background:#fbb"
| 105 || August 4 || Cardinals || 2–3 || Jerry Reuss (3–4) || Chris Short (5–12) || Chuck Taylor (6) || 14,253 || 49–56
|- style="background:#fbb"
| 106 || August 5 || @ Pirates || 0–4 || Luke Walker (8–3) || Rick Wise (9–9) || None || 12,915 || 49–57
|- style="background:#fbb"
| 107 || August 6  || @ Pirates || 0–4 || Dock Ellis (12–8) || Jim Bunning (8–11) || None ||  || 49–58
|- style="background:#fbb"
| 108 || August 6  || @ Pirates || 3–8 || Bruce Dal Canton (7–1) || Bill Champion (0–1) || None || 26,664 || 49–59
|- style="background:#bfb"
| 109 || August 7 || Cubs || 4–1 || Grant Jackson (3–10) || Ferguson Jenkins (13–13) || Dick Selma (15) || 8,123 || 50–59
|- style="background:#bfb"
| 110 || August 8 || Cubs || 6–3 || Chris Short (6–12) || Bill Hands (13–9) || None || 10,964 || 51–59
|- style="background:#fbb"
| 111 || August 9  || Cubs || 1–4 || Milt Pappas (7–5) || Rick Wise (9–10) || Phil Regan (10) ||  || 51–60
|- style="background:#bfb"
| 112 || August 9  || Cubs || 6–1 || Barry Lersch (3–0) || Larry Gura (1–2) || None || 19,907 || 52–60
|- style="background:#bfb"
| 113 || August 11 || @ Astros || 6–5 || Jim Bunning (9–11) || Jack Billingham (10–5) || Dick Selma (16) || 18,184 || 53–60
|- style="background:#fbb"
| 114 || August 12 || @ Astros || 0–4 || Larry Dierker (11–10) || Grant Jackson (3–11) || None || 16,677 || 53–61
|- style="background:#fbb"
| 115 || August 13 || @ Astros || 3–4 || Jim Ray (5–3) || Dick Selma (5–6) || Fred Gladding (12) || 14,413 || 53–62
|- style="background:#bfb"
| 116 || August 14 || @ Reds || 5–4 || Rick Wise (10–10) || Mel Behney (0–1) || Joe Hoerner (9) || 31,604 || 54–62
|- style="background:#fbb"
| 117 || August 15 || @ Reds || 4–5  || Ray Washburn (2–4) || Bill Champion (0–2) || None || 42,606 || 54–63
|- style="background:#fbb"
| 118 || August 16 || @ Reds || 2–4 || Tony Cloninger (6–4) || Jim Bunning (9–12) || Wayne Granger (27) || 45,059 || 54–64
|- style="background:#fbb"
| 119 || August 17 || @ Reds || 3–9 || Jim Merritt (18–10) || Grant Jackson (3–12) || None || 23,255 || 54–65
|- style="background:#fbb"
| 120 || August 18 || @ Braves || 2–3 || Hoyt Wilhelm (5–3) || Chris Short (6–13) || None || 9,560 || 54–66
|- style="background:#fbb"
| 121 || August 19 || @ Braves || 2–3 || Pat Jarvis (14–10) || Rick Wise (10–11) || Bob Priddy (7) || 8,129 || 54–67
|- style="background:#fbb"
| 122 || August 20 || @ Braves || 2–6 || Ron Reed (6–5) || Barry Lersch (3–1) || None || 9,868 || 54–68
|- style="background:#bfb"
| 123 || August 21  || Astros || 9–3 || Jim Bunning (10–12) || Jack Billingham (10–6) || None ||  || 55–68
|- style="background:#fbb"
| 124 || August 21  || Astros || 1–9 || Don Wilson (6–5) || Grant Jackson (3–13) || None || 8,113 || 55–69
|- style="background:#bfb"
| 125 || August 22 || Astros || 2–1 || Joe Hoerner (7–3) || Fred Gladding (4–2) || None || 15,276 || 56–69
|- style="background:#bfb"
| 126 || August 23 || Astros || 4–0 || Rick Wise (11–11) || Wade Blasingame (1–1) || Dick Selma (17) || 3,485 || 57–69
|- style="background:#bfb"
| 127 || August 25 || Reds || 3–2  || Dick Selma (6–6) || Wayne Granger (6–4) || None || 14,508 || 58–69
|- style="background:#fbb"
| 128 || August 26 || Reds || 5–6 || Jim Merritt (20–10) || Jim Bunning (10–13) || Wayne Granger (29) || 13,322 || 58–70
|- style="background:#bfb"
| 129 || August 27 || Reds || 6–3 || Grant Jackson (4–13) || Jim McGlothlin (11–8) || None || 11,992 || 59–70
|- style="background:#bfb"
| 130 || August 28 || Braves || 5–2 || Chris Short (7–13) || Jim Nash (12–7) || Dick Selma (18) || 7,908 || 60–70
|- style="background:#bfb"
| 131 || August 29 || Braves || 10–9 || Joe Hoerner (8–3) || Ron Reed (6–6) || Dick Selma (19) || 9,747 || 61–70
|- style="background:#bfb"
| 132 || August 30 || Braves || 4–2 || Barry Lersch (4–1) || Pat Jarvis (15–11) || Dick Selma (20) || 9,104 || 62–70

|- style="background:#bfb"
| 133 || September 1 || @ Cubs || 3–2  || Woodie Fryman (8–6) || Phil Regan (4–8) || Chris Short (1) || 23,992 || 63–70
|- style="background:#fbb"
| 134 || September 2 || @ Cubs || 2–17 || Milt Pappas (11–6) || Grant Jackson (4–14) || Bob Miller (2) || 16,234 || 63–71
|- style="background:#fbb"
| 135 || September 3 || @ Cubs || 2–7 || Ferguson Jenkins (18–14) || Chris Short (7–14) || None || 10,675 || 63–72
|- style="background:#fbb"
| 136 || September 4 || @ Pirates || 3–4 || Steve Blass (9–10) || Rick Wise (11–12) || John Lamb (1) || 22,547 || 63–73
|- style="background:#fbb"
| 137 || September 5 || @ Pirates || 4–6 || Fred Cambria (1–1) || Barry Lersch (4–2) || Dave Giusti (22) || 22,925 || 63–74
|- style="background:#fbb"
| 138 || September 6 || @ Pirates || 3–4  || Luke Walker (11–6) || Dick Selma (6–7) || None || 19,049 || 63–75
|- style="background:#bfb"
| 139 || September 7  || Cardinals || 5–1 || Chris Short (8–14) || Jerry Reuss (5–7) || None ||  || 64–75
|- style="background:#bfb"
| 140 || September 7  || Cardinals || 3–2  || Joe Hoerner (9–3) || Bob Chlupsa (0–2) || None || 14,166 || 65–75
|- style="background:#fbb"
| 141 || September 8 || Cardinals || 3–5 || Steve Carlton (9–18) || Rick Wise (11–13) || None || 3,995 || 65–76
|- style="background:#bfb"
| 142 || September 9  || @ Mets || 3–2 || Barry Lersch (5–2) || Danny Frisella (6–3) || None ||  || 66–76
|- style="background:#fbb"
| 143 || September 9  || @ Mets || 1–3 || Ray Sadecki (8–4) || Grant Jackson (4–15) || None || 26,005 || 66–77
|- style="background:#fbb"
| 144 || September 10 || @ Mets || 2–3  || Ron Herbel (9–5) || Joe Hoerner (9–4) || None || 14,307 || 66–78
|- style="background:#fbb"
| 145 || September 11 || @ Expos || 0–1 || Carl Morton (16–10) || Chris Short (8–15) || None || 14,637 || 66–79
|- style="background:#fbb"
| 146 || September 12 || @ Expos || 3–4 || Steve Renko (11–10) || Lowell Palmer (1–2) || Howie Reed (5) || 25,221 || 66–80
|- style="background:#fbb"
| 147 || September 13 || @ Expos || 2–4 || John O'Donoghue (3–2) || Joe Hoerner (9–5) || None || 11,387 || 66–81
|- style="background:#fbb"
| 148 || September 15 || Pirates || 3–8 || Luke Walker (13–6) || Barry Lersch (5–3) || Dave Giusti (24) || 4,802 || 66–82
|- style="background:#fbb"
| 149 || September 16 || Pirates || 3–5 || Bob Moose (11–9) || Jim Bunning (10–14) || John Lamb (2) || 4,418 || 66–83
|- style="background:#bfb"
| 150 || September 17 || Pirates || 3–2 || Chris Short (9–15) || John Lamb (0–1) || Dick Selma (21) || 4,199 || 67–83
|- style="background:#bfb"
| 151 || September 18 || @ Cardinals || 9–7 || Grant Jackson (5–15) || Nelson Briles (5–7) || Dick Selma (22) || 12,385 || 68–83
|- style="background:#bfb"
| 152 || September 19 || @ Cardinals || 10–6 || Rick Wise (12–13) || Frank Bertaina (1–2) || Fred Wenz (1) || 11,143 || 69–83
|- style="background:#bfb"
| 153 || September 20 || @ Cardinals || 7–4  || Dick Selma (7–7) || Harry Parker (1–1) || None || 14,681 || 70–83
|- style="background:#fbb"
| 154 || September 22 || Mets || 6–7 || Nolan Ryan (7–10) || Dick Selma (7–8) || Dean Chance (5) || 5,064 || 70–84
|- style="background:#fbb"
| 155 || September 23 || Mets || 4–5 || Tug McGraw (4–6) || Dick Selma (7–9) || None || 5,683 || 70–85
|- style="background:#bfb"
| 156 || September 25 || Cubs || 5–3 || Rick Wise (13–13) || Milt Pappas (12–9) || None || 6,108 || 71–85
|- style="background:#bfb"
| 157 || September 26 || Cubs || 7–1 || Barry Lersch (6–3) || Bill Hands (17–15) || None || 4,616 || 72–85
|- style="background:#fbb"
| 158 || September 27 || Cubs || 3–5 || Ferguson Jenkins (21–16) || Jim Bunning (10–15) || None || 4,377 || 72–86
|- style="background:#fbb"
| 159 || September 29 || Expos || 3–10 || Steve Renko (13–11) || Chris Short (9–16) || Mike Marshall (2) || 1,055 || 72–87
|- style="background:#fbb"
| 160 || September 30 || Expos || 4–5 || Bill Stoneman (7–15) || Rick Wise (13–14) || Mike Marshall (3) || 1,186 || 72–88

|- style="background:#bfb"
| 161 || October 1 || Expos || 2–1  || Dick Selma' (8–9) || Howie Reed (6–5) || None || 31,822 || 73–88

|-
| style="font-size:88%" |
The September 4 game was suspended in the top of the seventh inning with the score 1–4 and was completed September 5, 1970.
|-
|  Source: 

 Roster 

 Player stats 

 Batting 

 Starters by position Note: Pos = Position; G = Games played; AB = At bats; H = Hits; Avg. = Batting average; HR = Home runs; RBI = Runs batted in Other batters Note: G = Games played; AB = At bats; H = Hits; Avg. = Batting average; HR = Home runs; RBI = Runs batted in Pitching 

 Starting pitchers Note: G = Games pitched; IP = Innings pitched; W = Wins; L = Losses; ERA = Earned run average; SO = Strikeouts Other pitchers Note: G = Games pitched; IP = Innings pitched; W = Wins; L = Losses; ERA = Earned run average; SO = Strikeouts Relief pitchers Note: G = Games pitched; W = Wins; L = Losses; SV = Saves; ERA = Earned run average; SO = Strikeouts Farm system 

 Notes 

 References 
1970 Philadelphia Phillies season at Baseball Reference''

Philadelphia Phillies seasons
Philadelphia Phillies season
Philadelph